"Rodney Come Home" is the ninth Christmas special episode of the BBC sitcom Only Fools and Horses, first screened on 25 December 1990.

Unlike the other Christmas specials, this episode is not a one-off story, but sets up story arcs that run throughout the following series. It was filmed in the recording block for series 7.

Synopsis

At the Broadwalk Shopping Centre, Del Boy tries to sell children's dolls, before discovering that they sing Chinese lullabies.

Meanwhile, at Parry Print Ltd, a hungry Rodney discovers that Cassandra made him a very meagre sandwich for lunch, and his new secretary refuses to go out and buy him a hamburger during her lunch break because an important client is due to meet him. However, when he spots Raquel with shopping bags full of food, Rodney invites her into his office for a coffee and they chat about the tour that Raquel has been on since the events of "The Jolly Boys' Outing", and how Rodney's marriage with Cassandra is faring. Despite claiming they are happy together, Rodney implies that he and Cassandra are experiencing difficulties.

That evening, Rodney returns home to his flat, only to find that Cassandra has not prepared dinner for him and is instead going out to play badminton. They argue, and Cassandra accuses Rodney of being childish if he expects her to cook for him like a servant from the 1930s. Rodney subsequently storms out. Meanwhile, at Nelson Mandela House, Del and Raquel are enjoying a romantic dinner and, just as Del is about to proposition Raquel, Rodney bursts in and tells everyone that his marriage is over. Rodney decides to sleep in his old bedroom, but Del tells him that Raquel is sleeping there, so Rodney will be sleeping on the sofa.

A week later, at a nightclub, as Del and Raquel dance, Rodney is getting drunk with his friends Mickey Pearce and Chris, which leaves Del concerned. Del tries to make Rodney see sense and return to Cassandra, but Rodney refuses to listen.

The next evening, back at the flat, Del tells Albert that when Rodney took the Trotter van down to the Peckham Exhaust Centre earlier that morning to get it fixed, he foolishly arranged a date with an attractive receptionist, Tanya, following Mickey Pearce's advice to make Cassandra jealous. When Rodney tells Del, Raquel, and Albert that he is going to see Honey, I Shrunk the Kids with Tanya, they try to talk him out of his date, but Rodney ignores them and heads off. Del then realises that Rodney is deliberately taking Tanya to the cinema opposite Cassandra's evening school, where he hopes Cassandra will see them together. Aware that this will lose Rodney both his marriage and his job, Del goes over to Cassandra's flat to persuade her not to go to her class, and ends up breaking the bad news to her. Cassandra is reduced to tears, but agrees not to tell her parents.

Later, back at the flat at midnight, as Del tries to remove the voice boxes from the Chinese dolls, he gets a telephone call from Rodney, who took Del's advice, cancelled his date, and has decided to wait at his flat for Cassandra, so they can be reconciled. Before Del can warn him about what he just did, Rodney hangs up and removes the receiver from the machine, preventing Del from calling him back. Del admits to Raquel and Albert that he told Cassandra, and then quickly drives over to Rodney and Cassandra's flat. Cassandra arrives moments before Del and furiously throws Rodney out. Rodney confronts Del over telling on him and sends him home, but realises that he himself has been locked out of his home, leaving him no choice but to go back to Nelson Mandela House with Del.

Episode cast

Music
 Magnum: "Reckless Man"
 Magnum: "Born to Be King"
 Feargal Sharkey: "Let Me Be"
 Spandau Ballet: "True"
 Bass-O-Matic: "Fascinating Rhythm"
 Loose Ends: "Don't Be a Fool"
 Lisa Stansfield: "This Is the Right Time"
 Billy Idol: "Rebel Yell"
 Julia Fordham: "Did I Happen to Mention"
 Julia Fordham: "Your Lovely Face"
 Joan Armatrading: "Somebody Who Loves You"

External links

Full Episode Script

1990 British television episodes
Only Fools and Horses special episodes
British Christmas television episodes